Andrzej Nowicki may refer to:
 Andrzej Nowicki (philosopher) (1919-2011), Grand Orient of Poland
 Andrzej Nowicki (writer) (1909-1986)